The men's sidehorse vault event was part of the gymnastics programme at the 1924 Summer Olympics. It was one of nine gymnastics events. The competition was held on Tuesday, July 22, 1924.

Seventy gymnasts from nine nations competed. The "sidehorse vault" event used a vaulting horse set sideways (perpendicular to the approach) for gymnasts to turn and make a single flip. This was the only time that this event was held. The French achieved a podium sweep, which would not happen again at the Olympics until the 2014 Winter Olympics men's ski cross event.

Results

References

Official Olympic Report
 

Sidehorse vault